Eurometropolis Lille–Kortrijk–Tournai is a transborder agglomeration in Europe around the French city of Lille, and the Belgian cities Kortrijk and Tournai.

It covers the local regions Lille Métropole, south-eastern West Flanders (4 districts) and Wallonie Picarde (3 districts), 147 municipalities in total. The 2008 population was 2,155,161.

It is one of the EU-designated cross border regions under the auspices of European Grouping of Territorial Cooperation.

References

Lille-Kortrijk-Tournai
Geography of Kortrijk
Lille
Metropolitan areas of Belgium
Lille-Kortrijk-Tournai
Roubaix
Tourcoing
Tournai